Dariusz Nowakowski (born 7 December 1953) is a Polish judoka. He competed in the men's half-heavyweight event at the 1980 Summer Olympics.

References

1953 births
Living people
Polish male judoka
Olympic judoka of Poland
Judoka at the 1980 Summer Olympics
Sportspeople from Kraków